Stefano Marchetti may refer to:
 Stefano Marchetti (ice hockey) (born 1986), Italian ice hockey player
 Stefano Marchetti (footballer, born 1963), Italian football player
 Stefano Marchetti (footballer, born 1998), Italian football player